This is a round-up of the 1986 Sligo Intermediate Football Championship. While Geevagh's ascension to the Senior grade in 1985 had proved brief, their return to Intermediate was equally so, as they won their second title in three years. This time Enniscrone were the losing team which was their second successive final defeat.

Quarter finals

Semi-finals

Sligo Intermediate Football Championship Final

Sligo Intermediate Football Championship
Sligo Intermediate Football Championship